The Secretary General of the Rajya Sabha is the administrative head of the Rajya Sabha Secretariat. The secretary general is appointed by the Chairman of Rajya Sabha (Vice President of India). In Indian order of precedence, the post of secretary general is of the rank of Cabinet Secretary, who is the senior most bureaucrat in the Government of India.

Role 
As the administrative head of the Rajya Sabha secretariat, the secretary general exercises the power vested in the Chairman of Rajya Sabha, including the determination of the strength, method of recruitment and of qualifications for various categories of post. The secretary general exercises financial powers and initiates budget proposals relating to the Rajya Sabha. The secretary general is assisted by a hierarchy of officers as Secretary, Joint Secretaries and Directors, who with the help of subordinate officers perform the entire functions of the Secretariat.

It is the responsibility of the secretary general to summon each Member of Rajya Sabha to attend session of Parliament. When the President arrives to address Parliament, the secretary general along with Prime Minister, Vice President, Lok Sabha Speaker, Minister of Parliamentary Affairs receive the President at the gate of Parliament House and escorts the President to the Central Hall of the Parliament.

The secretary general prepares a list of business for each day of the session in Rajya Sabha. The secretary general signs messages to be sent from Rajya Sabha to Lok Sabha and reports to the house messages received from the Lok Sabha. For the elections of President and Vice President, Secretary General of Rajya Sabha or Lok Sabha is appointed as returning officer along with one or more assistant returning officers.

List of Secretary General of the Rajya Sabha

See also 
 Parliament of India
 Rajya Sabha
 Rajya Sabha Secretariat
 Chairman of the Rajya Sabha
 Deputy Chairman of the Rajya Sabha
 Leader of the House in Rajya Sabha
 Leader of the Opposition in Rajya Sabha
 Secretary General of the Lok Sabha

References 

Rajya Sabha